A blacklight poster or black light poster is a poster printed with inks which fluoresce under a black light. The inks used contain phosphors which cause them to glow when exposed to ultraviolet light emitted from black lights.

Overview
Although black lights date to 1903 with the development of the optical filter glass Wood's glass, fluorescent ink was not developed until 1932 when the Switzer brothers were inspired by a Popular Science magazine article to experiment in their father's pharmacy. Their Day-Glo Color Corp. marketed the ink chiefly to the military before a counterculture emerged to embrace the aesthetic. The 1960s saw the pervasive use of recreational drugs, especially mass use of hallucinogenics such as LSD (lysergic acid diethylamide), mescaline, and marijuana for the first time.  With the ability to glow and vibrate under ultraviolet light, the posters could simulate the sensations and visual distortions one experienced during an acid trip.

In the United States, blacklight posters emerged as part of the psychedelic fashion scene between 1967 and 1969. The style was popular in advertisements for concerts at venues like the Fillmore and Avalon Ballroom, and further promoted and commercialized by companies like Pandora Productions (established in Minneapolis, 1964) and the Houston Black Light Company (Houston, 1969). Designs ranged from respectful copies of concert posters to prurient adolescent fantasies. At its height radical black artists found inspiration in the aesthetic, such as Faith Ringgold's series of Black Light paintings that eschewed any white pigment, or Barbara Jones-Hogu's prints (especially Relate to Your Heritage). Commercial producers happily reciprocated by incorporating blaxploitation themes into their posters, as in George Goode's series for the Houston Black Light Company and George Stowe Jr.'s work for One Stop Posters.

Since then, the art form has gone out of fashion and is generally viewed as a relic of the 1970s.

Although blacklight posters have continually been produced since the 1960s, there has been a resurgence in popularity since 2007 as blacklight and glow-in-the-dark parties have become more popular.  As of 2014, there are five companies actively producing new and classic flocked blacklight posters in a wide range of content, including music, nature, and pop culture. The black parts of these posters are overlaid with black flocking, which gives it a velvet feel, and these are often referred to as velvet posters.

Artists continue to make use of the material, notably Dorothy Cross's 1998 Ghost Ship (a decommissioned light ship painted to glow at night, evoking the pigment's original military purposes), or Hank Willis Thomas's 2014 screenprints And I Can't Run and Blow the Man Down (exposing black victims under fluorescent light, evoking the pigment's historic association with black radicalism).

References

Posters
Hippie movement
1970s fads and trends
Drug culture
Fluorescence
Novelty items